The Billings Marlboros were a Continental Hockey League (CnHL) ice hockey team from Billings, Montana, active during the 1985–86 season. The team played at the MetraPark Arena. The CnHL and the Marlboros folded in 1986.

Notable players
Former National Hockey League player Greg Carroll skated with the Marlboros during the 1985–86 season, scoring 17 goals and 29 assists for 46 points in nine games played.

References

Sports in Billings, Montana
1985 establishments in Montana
1986 disestablishments in Montana
Ice hockey clubs established in 1985
Sports clubs disestablished in 1986
Ice hockey teams in Montana